NGC 6028 is a barred lenticular galaxy and a ring galaxy located about 200 million light-years away in the constellation Hercules. Ring galaxies such as NGC 6028 are also known as Hoag-type galaxies as they may have a resemblance to the prototype, Hoag's Object.  NGC 6028 was discovered by astronomer William Herschel on March 14, 1784. It was then rediscovered by astronomer Guillaume Bigourdan on May 4, 1886.

Physical characteristics
NGC 6028 consists of a luminous core that is surrounded by a fainter outer ring. Unlike Hoag's Object, NGC 6028's core is elongated indicating the presence of a weak bar embedded in a lens-like structure. The outer ring of the galaxy appears asymmetric in structure and may be made up of tightly wound spiral arms. The observed  asymmetry could be the result of one arm being richer in H II regions than the other arm.

Group membership
NGC 6028 appears to lie near the Hercules cluster in the sky. However, NGC 6028 is not a member of that cluster but instead belongs to a foreground group of galaxies known as G47.

See also
 List of NGC objects (6001–7000)
 List of ring galaxies
 Hoag's Object
 Cartwheel Galaxy
 PGC 1000714
 UGC 4599 - galaxy closely resembling Hoag's Object

References

External links

Hercules (constellation)
Ring galaxies
Lenticular galaxies
Barred lenticular galaxies
6028
56716
10135
Astronomical objects discovered in 1784
Discoveries by William Herschel